Ronald Reagan Washington National Airport station is a Washington Metro station in Arlington, Virginia on the Blue and Yellow Lines. The station platform is elevated and covered and is the last above-ground station on the Yellow Line in Virginia, heading into Washington, D.C. It is one of only two stations in the system to have three tracks (the other being ). The station is located across Smith Boulevard from Terminal 2 at Ronald Reagan Washington National Airport; the mezzanine is directly connected to Level 2 of the terminal (security checkpoints/gates level) by two pedestrian bridges. Airport shuttle buses or a walkway connect the station and Terminal 1. The airport's Abingdon Plantation historical site is near the station.

History 

The station opened on July 1, 1977.

When service began on July 1, 1977, it was the southern terminus of the Blue Line. After the Yellow Line extension to  opened on December 17, 1983, the station remained the southern terminus for the Blue Line until the  station opened in 1991.

During construction of a second canopy at the station, Metro began running trains through the center track even though it had not been constructed for standard operations, and on January 20, 2003, a Blue Line train derailed at the switch. No injuries resulted, but the accident delayed construction by a number of weeks. The center track was originally intended for relaying trains.

In 2014, a train was temporarily parked in the middle track while one of the elevators in the station was repaired, creating a "train bridge" to allow passengers to walk through the train to transfer between directions.

In May 2018, Metro announced an extensive renovation of platforms at twenty stations across the system. The Ronald Reagan Washington National Airport station served as a temporary southern terminal for the Blue and Yellow Lines from May to September 2019, while the stations south of the National Airport station were closed. The platforms at the National Airport station itself were rebuilt from August to December 2020.

Between May 25 and September 8, 2019, all trains terminated at this station due to the Platform improvement project which closed stations south of Ronald Reagan Airport. Between September 10 until November 5, 2022, all trains also terminated at Ronald Reagan airport due to the Potomac Yard station tie-in, closing all stations South of the station.

Renaming controversy 
The station retained its original name after the airport was renamed in 1998 from "Washington National Airport" to "Ronald Reagan Washington National Airport". In early 2001, a letter signed by 24 members of Congress requested WMATA rename the station to conform. However, according to a Metro policy adopted in 1987, groups seeking to rename a station were required to pay the cost of replacing signs and maps. The Arlington County government, which could have made the change, demurred—the price was estimated at $400,000—and WMATA subsequently declined to rename the station on April 19, 2001. In response, Republican Congressman Bob Barr of Georgia threatened to withhold federal funding from the agency unless the station was renamed. Congress ultimately voted to require the renaming on November 30, 2001. According to then-General Manager Richard A. White, Metro paid to complete the renaming.

During the 2003–2004 renovation of the station, new signage was installed.

Station layout 
The station has two island platforms across three tracks, with the center track not used for regular service.

References

External links 
 

 The Schumin Web Transit Center: Ronald Reagan Washington National Airport Station
 Station from Google Maps Street View
 Map of Ronald Reagan Washington National Airport showing location of Metro station

Airport railway stations in the United States
Transportation in Arlington County, Virginia
Stations on the Blue Line (Washington Metro)
Stations on the Yellow Line (Washington Metro)
Washington Metro stations in Virginia
Railway stations in the United States opened in 1977
1977 establishments in Virginia
Station